The 2012 CAF Champions League qualifying rounds decided the eight teams which played in the group stage.

The schedule for the tournament was released in October 2011, and the draw for all three rounds was held in Cairo on 9 December 2011.

Qualification ties were decided over two legs, with aggregate goals used to determine the winner. If the sides were level on aggregate after the second leg, the away goals rule was applied, and if still level, the tie proceeded directly to a penalty shootout (no extra time was played).

Preliminary round
This was a knock-out stage of the 38 teams that did not receive byes to the first round.

First legs: 17–19 February; Second legs: 2–4 March.

ASO Chlef won 4–1 on aggregate and advanced to the first round.

Note: Both legs postponed per agreement between AS Vita Club and Athlético Olympic.

AS Vita Club won 6–4 on aggregate and advanced to the first round.

2–2 on aggregate. DFC 8ème Arrondissement won on the away goals rule and advanced to the first round.

Zamalek won 2–1 on aggregate and advanced to the first round.

Africa Sports won 4–3 on aggregate and advanced to the first round.

Horoya AC won 1–0 on aggregate and advanced to the first round.

JSM Béjaïa won 3–1 on aggregate and advanced to the first round.

Note: Second leg postponed due to explosions in Brazzaville.

AFAD Djékanou won 2–0 on aggregate and advanced to the first round.

APR won 1–0 on aggregate and advanced to the first round.

Ethiopian Coffee won 4–2 on aggregate and advanced to the first round.

Tonnerre won 1-0 on aggregate and advanced to the first round.

Recreativo do Libolo won 4–2 on aggregate and advanced to the first round.

URA won 3–0 on aggregate and advanced to the first round.

Note: Second leg postponed per request from Liga Muçulmana.

Liga Muçulmana won 5–0 on aggregate and advanced to the first round.

1–1 on aggregate. Brikama United won the penalty shootout and advanced to the first round.

Dolphins won 6–0 on aggregate and advanced to the first round.

Berekum Chelsea won 5–0 on aggregate and advanced to the first round.

FC Platinum won 8–2 on aggregate and advanced to the first round.

Power Dynamos won 8–1 on aggregate and advanced to the first round.

First round
This was a knock-out stage of 32 teams; the 19 teams advancing from the preliminary round, and 13 teams that received byes into this round.

First legs: 23–25 March; Second legs: 6–8 April.

ASO Chlef won 3–2 on aggregate and advanced to the second round.

Al-Hilal won 8–1 on aggregate and advanced to the second round.

2–2 on aggregate. Zamalek won on the away goals rule and advanced to the second round.

Maghreb de Fès won 4–1 on aggregate and advanced to the second round.

AFAD Djékanou won 5–1 on aggregate and advanced to the second round.

Étoile du Sahel won 3–2 on aggregate and advanced to the second round.

Al-Ahly won 3–0 on aggregate and advanced to the second round.

Note: First leg postponed due to closure of airport in Bamako after the Malian crisis preventing Stade Malien to travel. Second leg also postponed per request from Tonnerre.

Stade Malien won 5–2 on aggregate and advanced to the second round.

4–4 on aggregate. Sunshine Stars  won on the away goals rule and advanced to the second round.

Djoliba advanced to the second round after being awarded the tie by CAF, as URA did not travel to Mali for the second leg due to the Malian crisis.

Dynamos won 3–2 on aggregate and advanced to the second round.

Espérance ST won 4–2 on aggregate and advanced to the second round.

2–2 on aggregate. Coton Sport won on the away goals rule and advanced to the second round.

Berekum Chelsea won 5–3 on aggregate and advanced to the second round.

Al-Merreikh won 5–2 on aggregate and advanced to the second round.

TP Mazembe won 7–1 on aggregate and advanced to the second round.

Second round
This was a knock-out stage of the 16 teams that advance from the first round; winners advanced to the group stage, while the losers advanced to the Confederation Cup play-off round.

First legs: 27–29 April; Second legs 11–14 May.

2–2 on aggregate. ASO Chlef won the penalty shootout and advanced to the group stage. Al-Hilal advanced to the Confederation Cup play-off round.

Zamalek won 4–0 on aggregate and advanced to the group stage. Maghreb de Fes advanced to the Confederation Cup play-off round.

Étoile du Sahel won 4–2 on aggregate and advanced to the group stage. AFAD Djékanou advanced to the Confederation Cup play-off round.

Al-Ahly won 3–2 on aggregate and advanced to the group stage. Stade Malien advanced to the Confederation Cup play-off round.

Sunshine Stars won 2–1 on aggregate and advanced to the group stage. Djoliba advanced to the Confederation Cup play-off round.

Esperance ST won 7–1 on aggregate and advanced to the group stage. Dynamos advanced to the Confederation Cup play-off round.

Berekum Chelsea won 2–1 on aggregate and advanced to the group stage. Coton Sport advanced to the Confederation Cup play-off round.

TP Mazembe won on 3–1 aggregate and advanced to the group stage. Al-Merreikh advanced to the Confederation Cup play-off round.

References

External links
CAF Champions League

Qualifying rounds